Ingefærnøtter, or ginger nuts, are a Norwegian cookie known for their spiced taste, utilizing ginger, cinnamon, nutmeg, cardamom, and black pepper in their recipes. They are frequently baked during Christmastime in regions throughout Norway as one of the syv slag, or "seven kinds (of christmas cookies)", served.

Gallery

See also 
 List of Norwegian desserts
 Norwegian cuisine
 Gingersnap

References 

Norwegian cuisine
Norwegian desserts